Pont Marie is a station of the Paris Métro opened in 1926 with the extension of Line 7 from Palais Royal–Musée du Louvre. It is named after the nearby bridge over the Seine, the Pont Marie, which connects to Île Saint-Louis.

Station layout

Gallery

References
Roland, Gérard (2003). Stations de métro. D’Abbesses à Wagram. Éditions Bonneton.

Paris Métro stations in the 4th arrondissement of Paris
Railway stations in France opened in 1926